The District Grand Lodge of Bengal is a Masonic Lodge in India under the United Grand Lodge of England, based out of Freemasons Hall, Park Street, Kolkata (19 Mother Teressa Sarani ).

The District Grand Lodge of Bengal has exercised authority over freemasonry under the UGLE in India since 1729, when Captain Ralph Farrwinter, an officer of the East India Company, was appointed Provincial Grand Master for East India in Bengal, and warranted the first Indian lodge East India Arms, No. 72, based in Fort William, Calcutta (Firminger 6).

Members of the District Grand Lodge of Bengal were some of the biggest figures of the British Raj.

Emir of Afghanistan 
It was the scene of the induction of Emir Habibullah Khan IV of Afghanistan by Lord Kitchener and Sir William Burkitt on 1 Feb 1907.  An account of this highly unusual event was written at the time by Sir Henry McMahon.

District Grandmasters

References 

Freemasonry
Masonic Lodges
History of India